Erskine is a hamlet in Alberta, Canada, within County of Stettler No. 6. Previously an incorporated municipality, Erskine dissolved from village status on May 10, 1946, to become part of the Municipal District of Waverly No. 367.

It was established in 1905 and named after British jurist Thomas Erskine, 1st Baron Erskine (1750–1823).

History 
Erskine was home to one of the worst mass slayings in Alberta when Social Credit Stettler representative John Clark murdered seven people before committing suicide on June 3, 1956.

Demographics 

See also 
List of communities in Alberta
List of designated places in Alberta
List of former urban municipalities in Alberta
List of hamlets in Alberta

References 

Hamlets in Alberta
Designated places in Alberta
Former villages in Alberta
County of Stettler No. 6